The 2018 Kuwait Emir Cup was the 56th edition.

Bracket

Note:     H: Home team,   A: Away team

Round of 16

Quarter-final

Semi-final

Final

Awards

Top scorer

References

External links

Kuwait Emir Cup seasons
Kuwait Emir Cup
Emir Cup